New York's 14th State Senate district is one of 63 districts in the New York State Senate. It has  been represented by Democrat Leroy Comrie since 2015, following his 2014 Democratic primary defeat of incumbent Malcolm Smith.

Geography
District 14 is located in eastern Queens, containing some or all of St. Albans, Cambria Heights, Jamaica, Hollis, Rosedale, Laurelton, Kew Gardens, and Queens Village.

The district overlaps with New York's 3rd, 5th, and 6th congressional districts, and with the 24th, 25th, 27th, 28th, 29th, 32nd, and 33rd districts of the New York State Assembly.

Recent election results

2020

2018

2016

2014

2012

Federal results in District 14

References

14